Mathías Rodrigo Pintos Chagas (born 26 December 1999) is a Uruguayan footballer who plays as a defender for Peñarol in the Uruguayan Primera División on loan from Liverpool Montevideo.

Career

Peñarol
In January 2019, Pintos joined Peñarol on a three-year loan, joining the club's youth team. Pintos made his first team debut for the club on 17 October 2020 in a 2-1 defeat to River Plate.

References

External links
Mathías Pintos at Football Database

1999 births
Living people
Liverpool F.C. (Montevideo) players
Uruguayan Primera División players
Uruguayan footballers
Association football defenders
Footballers from Montevideo